Inside Life is a BBC nature documentary series for children's television which aired on the CBBC Channel in autumn 2009. It is a companion to the BBC Natural History Unit's series, Life, which looks at the extraordinary lengths to which animals and plants go in order to survive and reproduce. The aim of Inside Life is to present this information in a way that is simple for children to understand. Each of the ten Inside Life programmes follows a lucky child as they accompany the Life filmmakers on expeditions around the world with the aim of capturing groundbreaking wildlife footage. The series is aimed at 7-9 year olds.

In each 30-minute programme, the presenter (called an Inside Life "agent") first sets out on a fact-finding assignment in the UK to discover more about the animal they will be filming, before joining the Natural History Unit's expedition team to try to film the species in the wild.

A hardback book, Inside Life by Doug Hope and Vanessa Coates was published 2 October 2009 to accompany the series. It is presented in the style of a scrapbook and gives an insight into the programme's creation, as well as providing educational material about the animals featured in the series.

A 2-disc DVD box set of the television series was released by 2Entertain on 30 November 2009.

Episodes

References

External links 
 
 BBC Showcase 2009 – Natural history
 Preview and video interview with Mike Gunton
 Official 'Life' Website

BBC children's television shows
2009 British television series debuts
2009 British television series endings
English-language television shows
Television series by BBC Studios